Myoza or Myosa is a high-ranking royal title and position for Burmese royalty and nobility.

History
The monarch had all the power to control everything in the kingdom. Below the monarch rank, minor queens, princes, princess, relatives of the royal family, nobles, ministers, and court officials had to own the major towns that represented a certain region. Since the Pagan era of the 11th century, each and every single member of the royal family received the title of Myosa (also Myoza), literally means "chief of town or territory", which is nearly equivalent to the title of Duke. All royals were given the honor of possessing at least one territory by the King. They were all mostly known by their possessions. For instance, Burma's last king, King Thibaw was called by his possession, when he was a prince, of a town called Thibaw (Hsipaw in Shan State).

Depending on their rank, royals and nobles were required to own towns. The younger children of a monarch, as well as junior officials and obscure nobles, owned land at the village level.

Administration of kingdom

The kingdom was divided into provinces called myo (town). These provinces were administered by Myoza ('governor of town'), who were members of the royal family or the highest-ranking officials of the Hluttaw. They collected revenue for the royal government, payable to the Shwedaik (Royal Treasury) in fixed instalments, and retained whatever was left over. Each myo was subdivided into districts called taik, administered by Taikza ('governor of district'), which contained collections of villages called ywa, administered by Ywaza ('governor of village').

The kingdom's peripheral coastal provinces (Pegu, Tenasserim, Martaban and Arakan) were administered by a Viceroy called a Myowun, who was appointed by the king and possessed civil, judicial, fiscal, and military powers. Provincial councils (myoyon) consisted of myo saye (town scribes), nakhandaw (receivers of royal orders), sitke (chiefs of war), htaunghmu (jailer), ayatgaung (head of the quarter), and dagahmu (warden of the gates). Each province was divided into districts called myo, each led by a myo ok (if appointed), or by a myo thugyi (if the office was hereditary). The Viceroy of Pegu was assisted by several additional officials, including an akhunwun (revenue officer), akaukwun (customs collector), and a yewun (conservator of port).

References

Sources
 
 
 

Dukedoms
Noble titles
Peerage